The Santa Maria River is a river in Mexico. It originates on the Mexican Plateau in the states of San Luis Potosí and Guanajuato, and flows westwards. For much of its length, it forms the border between San Luis Potosí and Guanajuato. It carves a canyon through the Sierra Madre Oriental, where it is joined by the Rio Verde. The Gallinas River merges into it via the 105-meter Tamul Waterfall, downstream of which its name changes to the Tampaón River. The Tampaón continues westwards to join the Moctezuma River and form the Pánuco River, which empties into the Gulf of Mexico at Ciudad Madero.

See also
List of rivers of Mexico

References
Atlas of Mexico, 1975 (http://www.lib.utexas.edu/maps/atlas_mexico/river_basins.jpg).
The Prentice Hall American World Atlas, 1984.
Rand McNally, The New International Atlas, 1993.

Rivers of San Luis Potosí
Rivers of Querétaro
Tributaries of the Pánuco River